Işık University is a private university located in Istanbul, Turkey. The university is a part of the Feyziye Schools Foundation's Işık Schools, which was established by the Feyz-i Sıbyan School in the city of Salonica on 14 December 1885 (now Thessaloniki).

History

The history of Feyziye Schools Foundation's Işık Schools (Feyziye Mektepleri Vakfı Işık Okulları) began with the establishment of Feyz-i Sıbyan School in the city of Salonica on 14 December 1885. It subsequently established additional schools in Salonica, including the Şemsi Efendi School attended by Mustafa Kemal Atatürk.

Following the Balkan Wars, when the city became part of Greece, the foundation moved to Nişantaşı Naciye Sultan Mansion in Istanbul. In 1935 during the 50th anniversary of the School, the name was changed from "Feyziye" to "Işık" (which means "light" in Turkish) with the blessings of Mustafa Kemal Atatürk. In 1986, the foundation completed its Maslak campus, in order to meet the need for educational institutions.

At the beginning of the 1996–1997 academic year, Işık University was launched in the Maslak campus, starting a new page in the history of the foundation.

Feyziye Schools Foundation now offers studies at all levels from preschool to graduate level education.

Campuses

Işık University operates two campuses. The Maslak campus is located in one of the business centers of Istanbul, while the suburban Şile campus, located  out of Istanbul, opened its doors in 2003. The Şile campus has been planned as a complete “educational campus” with dormitories, social facilities, and educational and administrative buildings situated in an area of 600 acres (2.4 km2). In 2005 summer, most of the university's academic and administrative departments (including the rector) moved to the Şile campus. Three faculties (Faculty of Engineering, Faculty of Arts and Sciences, Faculty of Economic and Administrative Sciences) and two institutes (Institute of Science and Engineering and Institute of Social Sciences) are located in Şile Campus, but the Faculty of Fine Arts remains in Maslak.

Academics
Işık University is home to 5 faculties and 2 institutes.

University Governance

Işık University is governed by a board of trustees, in conjunction with the university president and provosts and the deans of the various faculties.

Faculties and Departments

The faculties, institutes and departments of the university are

 Faculty of Engineering
 Department of Computer Science and Engineering
 Department of Electronics Engineering
 Department of Industrial Engineering
 Department of Mechanical Engineering
 Department of Mathematics Engineering
 Department of civil Engineering
 Department of Software Engineering
 Faculty of Arts and Sciences
 Department of Mathematics
 Department of Mathematical Engineering
 Department of Physics
 Department of Information Technologies
 Department of Management Information Systems
 Department of Humanities and Social Sciences
 Faculty of Economic and Administrative Sciences
 Department of Management
 Department of International Trade
 Department of Economics
 Department of Political Sciences
 Department of International Relations
 Faculty of Fine Arts
 Department of Graphic Arts and Graphical Design
 Department of Visual Arts
 Department of Interior Architecture
 Department of Industrial and Industrial Products Design
 Department of Fashion and Textile Design
 Institute of Science and Engineering
 Computer Engineering Programme (M.S., Ph.D.)
 Electronics Engineering Programme (M.S., Ph.D.)
 Mathematics Programme (M.S., Ph.D.)
 Information Technologies Programme (M.S.)
 Physics Programme (M.S.)
 Institute of Social Sciences
 Management Programme (M.A.)
 Management Information Systems Programme (M.S.)
 Middle East Studies Programme (M.A.)
 Contemporary Business Administration Programme (Ph.D.)

The university also incorporates an English as a Foreign Language School and a research center, namely Informatics Research and Development Center.

See also
 List of universities in Turkey

References

External links

 Işık University official web site
 F.M.V. Işık Schools and Işık University Alumni Communication and Union Site
 Society of Işık Students and Alumni
 F.M.V. Işık Schools official web site
 Işık University orientation program site

Private universities and colleges in Turkey
Universities and colleges in Istanbul
Şile
Educational institutions established in 1996
1996 establishments in Turkey